The 13th Virginia Cavalry Regiment was a cavalry regiment raised in Virginia for service in the Confederate States Army during the American Civil War. It fought mostly with the Army of Northern Virginia.

Virginia’s 13th Cavalry Regiment was formed in July 1862, using the 16th Battalion, Virginia Cavalry as its nucleus (itself formed from seven companies from the 12-month unit 5th Cavalry, Provisional Confederate Army). The men were from Petersburg and the counties of Southampton, Sussex, Prince George, Surry, and Nansemond. It was the second cavalry unit to bear the designation 13th Regiment, the first having ended its 12-month term of service in the spring of 1862.

It was assigned to W.H.F. Lee's, Chambliss', and Beale' Brigade in the Army of Northern Virginia. The unit was active in the conflicts at Fredericksburg, Brandy Station, Upperville, Hanover, Gettysburg, Bristoe, Kelly's Ford, and Mine Run. Later it participated in The Wilderness Campaign, the defense of Petersburg and Richmond, and the Appomattox operations.

This regiment had 298 men in action in Gettysburg and surrendered on April 9, 1865, with 10 officers and 78 men. The field officers were Colonels John R. Chambliss Jr. and Jefferson C. Phillips; Lieutenant Colonels Alexander Savage and Thomas H. Upshaw; and Majors Benjamin W. Belsches, Joseph E. Gillette, and Benjamin F. Winfield.

See also

List of Virginia Civil War units

References 

Units and formations of the Confederate States Army from Virginia
1862 establishments in Virginia
Military units and formations established in 1862
1865 disestablishments in Virginia
Military units and formations disestablished in 1865